Anton Diel (January 25, 1898 – April 6, 1959) was a German politician of the Social Democratic Party (SPD) and member of the German Bundestag.

Life 
He was a member of the German Bundestag from the first Bundestag elections in 1949 until his death. He always entered parliament via the Rhineland-Palatinate state list of the SPD.

Literature

References

1898 births
1959 deaths
Members of the Bundestag for Rhineland-Palatinate
Members of the Bundestag 1957–1961
Members of the Bundestag 1953–1957
Members of the Bundestag 1949–1953
Members of the Bundestag for the Social Democratic Party of Germany